The Crow Hills,  located in Massachusetts' Leominster State Forest 2.5 miles northeast of Mount Wachusett, are a single monadnock with a twin summit,  and , and a high eastern cliff. The hills are a popular rock climbing, bouldering, and hiking destination. The  Midstate Trail traverses the hills.

References
Leominster State Forest Department of Conservation and Recreation

Hills of Massachusetts
Climbing areas of the United States
Landforms of Worcester County, Massachusetts